JOF is the Japan Offspring Fund.

Jof or JOF may also refer to:
 Jôf di Montasio, a mountain in Italy
Jof Owen,  member of British duo The Boy Least Likely To
 Jof, a character in 1957 film The Seventh Seal